Morgan Studios (founded as Morgan Sound Studios) was an independent recording studio in Willesden in northwest London. Founded in 1967, the studio was the location for recordings by such notable artists as Jethro Tull, the Kinks, Paul McCartney, Yes, Black Sabbath, Donovan, Joan Armatrading, Cat Stevens, Rod Stewart, UFO and many more. Morgan sold its studios in the early 1980s, with some of its studios succeeded by Battery Studios.

History
Morgan Sound Studios was founded in 1967 by Barry Morgan, Monty Babson, Jerry Allen, and Leon Clavert, who were operating a jazz record label at Lansdowne Studios and wanting dedicated office space for their label. Upon securing a location at 169–171 High Road, in the Willesden area of northwest London, the musicians decided to also build a recording studio. They hired ex-Olympic Studios engineer Terry Brown to manage the studio, who appointed another Olympic Studios alumni, Andy Johns as chief engineer. Roy Thomas Baker, who would later achieve fame as an engineer and producer at Trident Studios, also worked at Morgan in its early years as an assistant engineer.

Studio manager Terry Brown knew that Clive Green was designing a new mixing console for Lansdowne Studios, and he asked if he could buy the design. Green instead chose to build the console himself, resulting in the founding of mixing console manufacturer Cadac Electronics. The first Cadac console - a custom hand-wired 8-channel split-console desk with transformerless balanced inputs and outputs - was installed at Morgan Studios. Morgan Studios initially operated with a modestly-sized 20 foot x 20 foot live room and a 17 foot x 10 foot control room with a Scully 1-inch 8-track recorder as well as Ampex 2-track and 4-rack recorders. The studios also had a Steinway grand piano and a Hammond organ.

In 1969, a new, larger Studio 1 was built upstairs, with the original studio being re-named Studio 2. The new studio was outfitted with a modular 24x16 Cadac mixing console, a 16-track 3M recorder, and a 2-track Studer A80. The same year, four of the studios' employees, including founder Barry Morgan, keyboardist Roger Coulam, guitarist Alan Parker, and bassist  Herbie Flowers joined forces with vocalists Roger Cook and Madeline Bell to form the British pop group Blue Mink.

In 1972, Morgan opened a significantly larger Studio 3 on the ground floor of a building across the street, outfitting it with a 24x24 Cadac console and a 3M M79 24-track recorder.

In 1974, Morgan purchased another property around the corner to open Studio 4, Morgan's largest studio space yet. Outfitted with a 28x24 Cadac mixing console, Studio 4 also had the distinction of being the recipient of the first Ampex 24-track tape recorder in England (although it was later replaced by a Studer A80).

Each of Morgan's control rooms had 3 EMT plate reverbs, 2 Pye limiters, and 2 UREI limiters. Morgan's studios also utilized Neumann U47 and U67 microphones.

Successors
In 1980, Morgan Studios 3 and 4 were sold to the Zomba Group and became Battery Studios. In 1984, Morgan Studios 1 and 2 were sold to Robin Millar and renamed Power Plant Studios, which closed 6 years later.

Recordings

Albums

1960s
The Doughnut in Granny's Greenhouse (1968) – Bonzo Dog Doo-Dah Band
Disposable (1968) – The Deviants
Tons of Sobs (1969) – Free
Audience (1969) – Audience
Blind Faith (1969) – Blind Faith
Ahead Rings Out (1969) – Blodwyn Pig
Free (1969) – Free
Mott the Hoople (1969) - Mott the Hoople
Led Zeppelin II (1969) – Led Zeppelin (partially)
Ssssh (1969) – Ten Years After
Stand Up (1969) – Jethro Tull
Supertramp (1969–1970) – Supertramp

1970s
McCartney (1970) – Paul McCartney 
Lola Versus Powerman and the Moneygoround, Part One (1970) – The Kinks
Open Road (1970) – Donovan
Gasoline Alley (1970) – Rod Stewart
It'll All Work Out in Boomland (1970) – T2
Benefit (1970) – Jethro Tull
Tea for the Tillerman (1970) – Cat Stevens
Friend's Friend's Friend (1970) – Audience
Long Player (portions) (1971) – FacesMeddle (1971) – Pink FloydEvery Picture Tells a Story (1971) – Rod StewartSt Radigunds (May/June 1971) – SpirogyraMuswell Hillbillies (1971) - The KinksAnticipation (1971) – Carly SimonCan I Have My Money Back? (1971) – Gerry RaffertyA Tear And A Smile (1971) – Tir na nOgMadman Across the Water (portions) (1971) – Elton JohnAmerica (1971) – AmericaTeaser and the Firecat (1971) – Cat StevensThick as a Brick (1972) – Jethro TullWaterfall (1972) – IfThe Six Wives of Henry VIII (1972) – Rick WakemanLou Reed (1972) – Lou ReedCatch Bull at Four (1972) – Cat StevensWringing Applause (1972) – B. A. RobertsonNever a Dull Moment (1972) – Rod StewartLady Lake (1972) – GnidrologThe Chieftains 4 (1972–1973) – The ChieftainsGreenslade – (1972–1973) Greenslade There Goes Rhymin' Simon (1973 – one song) – Paul Simon Camel (1973) – CamelA Passion Play (1973) – Jethro TullTales from Topographic Oceans (1973) – YesBillion Dollar Babies (1973) – Alice CooperSabbath Bloody Sabbath (1973) – Black SabbathBedside Manners Are Extra (1973) – Greenslade Orexis of Death (1973) – NecromandusBerlin (1973) – Lou ReedWar Child (1974) – Jethro TullBack to the Night (1974) – Joan ArmatradingJumblequeen (1974) – Bridget St JohnThe Psychomodo (1974) – Cockney RebelSmiler (1974) – Rod StewartSpyglass Guest (1974) – Greenslade Now We Are Six (1974) – Steeleye SpanPhenomenon (1974) – UFOThe Prince of Heaven's Eyes (1974) – FruuppThe Myths and Legends of King Arthur and the Knights of the Round Table (1974–1975) – Rick WakemanTime and Tide (1975) – Greenslade Sabotage (1975) – Black SabbathCommoners Crown (1975) – Steeleye SpanForce It (1975) – UFOReturn to Fantasy (1975) – Uriah HeepFish Out of Water (1975) – Chris SquireDance (1975) – Arthur BrownSad Wings of Destiny (1976) – Judas PriestNo Heavy Petting (1976) – UFOAnswer Me (1976) – Barbara DicksonElectric Savage (1976–1977) – Colosseum IIBaris Mancho (1976) – Barış MançoShe Wouldn't Understand (1976) – The GoodiesThe World Starts Tonight (1977) – Bonnie TylerSongs from the Wood (1977) – Jethro TullPeter Gabriel I (1977) – Peter GabrielChisholm in My Bosom (1977) – Arthur BrownThe Quiet Zone/The Pleasure Dome (1977) – Van der Graaf GeneratorAt the End of a Perfect Day (1977) – Chris de BurghCrna dama/Black Lady (1977/1978) – SmakSqueeze (1978) – SqueezeNatural Force (1978) – Bonnie TylerVariations (1978) – Andrew Lloyd WebberBack on the Streets (1978) – Gary MooreThree Imaginary Boys (1979) – The Cure

1980sSeventeen Seconds (1980) – The CureWild Cat (1980) – Tygers of Pan TangLampefeber (1980) – C. V. Moto The Affectionate Punch (1980) – The AssociatesBucks Fizz (1981) – Bucks FizzSpellbound (1981) – Tygers of Pan TangRenegade (1981) – Thin LizzyTeddy Boys Don't Knit (1981) – Vivian StanshallFaith (1981) – The CureIron Fist (1982) – MotörheadPictures On A String'' (1982) – Comateens

Singles

"Pinball Wizard" (1969) – The Who
"Riki Tiki Tavi" (1970) - Donovan
"Lola" (1970) – The Kinks
"Woodstock" (1970) – Matthews Southern Comfort
"Anticipation" (1971) – Carly Simon
"Hi, Hi, Hi" (1972) – Wings
"C Moon" (1972) – Wings
"Step into Christmas" (1973) – Elton John
"American Tune" (1974) – Paul Simon
"Monkey Jive" (1975) – Tiger Lily
"Your Generation" (1977) – Generation X
"News of the World" (1978) – The Jam
"Jumping Someone Else's Train" (1979) – The Cure
"C·30 C·60 C·90 Go" (1980) – Bow Wow Wow
"A Forest" (1980) – The Cure
"Primary" (1981) – The Cure
"Charlotte Sometimes" (1981) – The Cure
"Making Your Mind Up" (1981) – Bucks Fizz

See also
List of UK recording studios

References

Recording studios in London